On Shaw Ming (born 7 May 1977) is a Singaporean sport shooter who won a gold medal at the 2006 Commonwealth Games in Melbourne, Australia. He finished in a three-way tie with favourite Samaresh Jung of India and Gregory Yelavich of New Zealand on 578 points.

On made his mark as the champion at the Asean Army Rifle Meet in 2004, 2005, and 2006. Then, national shooter and army mate Poh Lip Meng invited him to take part in the Singapore Shooting Association's monthly shoot. He made the national training squad and then the national team.

References

External links
 On Shaw Ming's photo

Living people
1977 births
Singaporean male sport shooters
Singaporean people of Chinese descent
Commonwealth Games gold medallists for Singapore
Shooters at the 2006 Commonwealth Games
Shooters at the 2010 Asian Games
Commonwealth Games medallists in shooting
Asian Games competitors for Singapore
21st-century Singaporean people
Medallists at the 2006 Commonwealth Games